The Greek snake skink (Ophiomorus punctatissimus) is a species of skink, a lizard in the family Scincidae.

Geographic range
The skink can be found in Greece and Turkey.

Habitat
Its natural habitats are temperate grassland and plantations.

References

Further reading
Arnold EN, Burton JA. 1978. A Field Guide to Reptiles and Amphibians of Britain and Europe. London: Collins. 272 pp. . (Ophiomorus punctatissimus, p. 181 + Plate 33 + Map 99).
 Bibron G, Bory de Saint-Vincent JB. 1833. "Vertébrés a Sang froid. Reptiles et Poissons". pp. 57–76. In: Geoffroy Saint-Hilaire I, Geoffroy Saint-Hilaire É. 1833. Expédition scientifique de Morée. Section des Sciences physiques. Tome III.—1.re Partie. Zoologie. Première Section.—Des animaux vertébrés. Paris & Strasbourg: F.G. Levrault. 400 pp. + plates. (Anguis punctatissimus, pp. 71–72 + Plate XI, Figure 5).
 Boulenger GA. 1887. Catalogue of the Lizards in the British Museum (Natural History). Second Edition. Volume III. ... ,Scincidæ, ... London: Trustees of the British Museum (Natural History). (Taylor and Francis, printers). xii + 575 pp. + Plates I-XL. (Ophiomorus punctatissimus, p. 397).

Ophiomorus
skink, Limbless
skink, Limbless
Reptiles of Turkey
Taxa named by Gabriel Bibron
Taxa named by Jean Baptiste Bory de Saint-Vincent
Taxonomy articles created by Polbot
Reptiles described in 1833